Shaped Magnetic Field in Resonance (SMFIR) is the charging of vehicles electronically through a magnetic field to generate an electric charge.

Practical Applications
The most practical application for this technology is to convert a combustion engine driven transportation system to a green technology.

Breakthrough
South Korea on August the 6th, 2013, created the first ever high-tech electric charging road which uses this to charge an electrically driven (OLEV) bus.

References

Electric vehicle technologies